Alessandro Manni (born 16 February 1974) is a retired Italian footballer who played as a midfielder.

He played 1 game in the Serie A in the 1995/96 season for Udinese Calcio.

See also
Football in Italy
List of football clubs in Italy

References

External links
 

1974 births
Living people
People from Terni
Italian footballers
Serie A players
Serie B players
Ternana Calcio players
Udinese Calcio players
S.S. Fidelis Andria 1928 players
A.C. Prato players
Benevento Calcio players
S.S. Teramo Calcio players
U.S. Viterbese 1908 players
Vis Pesaro dal 1898 players
Footballers from Umbria
Association football midfielders
Sportspeople from the Province of Terni